Lena Gurr (1897–1992), was an American artist who made paintings, prints, and drawings showing, as one critic said, "the joys and sorrows of everyday life." Another critic noted that her still lifes, city scenes, and depictions of vacation locales were imbued with "quiet humor," while her portrayal of slum-dwellers and the victims of warfare revealed a "ready sympathy" for victims of social injustice at home and of warfare abroad. During the course of her career Gurr's compositions retained emotional content as they evolved from a naturalistic to a semi-abstract cubist style. Discussing this trend, she once told an interviewer that as her work tended toward increasing abstraction she believed it nonetheless "must have some kind of human depth to it." Born into a Russian-Jewish immigrant family, she was the wife of Joseph Biel, also Russian-Jewish and an artist of similar genre and sensibility.

Art training

Gurr began studying art at a young age. She was a member of the art club of her high school years and she studied art as a component of the teacher training she subsequently received. In 1919 she studied painting and printmaking at the Educational Alliance Art School and between 1920 and 1922 she won a scholarship to attend the Art Students League where she took classes with John Sloan and Maurice Sterne.

Artistic career

In 1926 and 1928 Gurr participated in group shows at the Whitney Studio Club in Greenwich Village and in 1928 she also participated in the 12th annual exhibition of the Society of Independent Artists at the Waldorf Roof in New York. From 1929 to 1931 Gurr took a leave of absence from her teaching position to travel in France with Joseph Biel, an artist whom she had met while studying at the Art Students League. They spent time in Nice and Mentone but mainly in Paris.

During the early months of 1931, while she was still abroad, her work appeared in group exhibitions held at the R. H. Macy department store and the Opportunity Gallery. Gurr's contributions to these shows drew the attention of two critics from the New York Times, one of whom said she appeared to abandon herself to the rich beauty of her medium and the other that her still lifes were excellent. In 1932 she participated in three shows: a solo exhibition at the Brooklyn Museum, an annual exhibition of the New York Society of Women Artists, and a group exhibition at the G.R.D. Studio. Of the G.R.D. show, Margaret Breuning, critic for the New York Post, said she appeared to be an artist of considerable experience capable of producing a "complex pattern of planes with nonchalant facility."

Her work drew critical attention three years later when, commencing what proved to be a long and productive relationship, she made her first appearance at the A.C.A. Gallery. Although Howard Devree, critic for the New York Times, praised in general terms the paintings she contributed to this show, he was more explicit in discussing a solo exhibition that the same gallery gave her later in the year. He said some of her work in the solo show tended toward caricature, but most of it was bold and forthright: "She turns out a piquant bit of social satire, an accomplished still-life with warmth of color and with finish, or a romantic landscape."

In 1936 Gurr joined National Association of Women Painters and Sculptors. During 1936, 1937, and 1938 she participated in group shows of the Salons of America (1936), the American Artists School (1936 and 1937), and the Municipal Art Gallery (1936 and 1937), Her group shows in 1938 included the annual exhibition held by the New York Society of Women Artists, a benefit show called "Roofs for 40 Million" held at Maison Francaise in the new Rockefeller Center, and another benefit show, put on by the Joint Distribution Committee at Studio Guild Galleries.

Two critics prepared lengthy reviews of a 1938–39 solo exhibition at the A.C.A. Gallery. Writing in December 1938, the New York Post'''s Jerome Klein praised Gurr's successful handling of varied subjects (local urban settings, countryside vacations, terror in distant lands) and in January 1939 Howard Devree noted her "capacity for transmuting homely scenes and incidents of every day life into pictures tinged with a kind of romantic realism and with quiet humor." The page on which Devree's review appeared was illustrated by a painting of Gurr's called On the Bridge which was on view in the show.

In the Spring of 1945 the A.C.A. Gallery gave Gurr her third solo exhibition. Reviewing this show, Melville Upton, critic for the New York Sun, saw a steady advance in her painting, noting a pleasing "structure of repeating and contrasting forms" in one picture and a "complicated and fanciful" design in another. In the New York Times, Howard Devree discussed her talent for depicting her subjects feelingly, using as her themes "human relationships and the joys and sorrows of everyday life." Peggy O'Reilly, of the Brooklyn Eagle, quoted Gurr as saying that while her aims were primarily aesthetic, she tried to be "a creature of what's around me." Regarding a painting called Indestructible, Gurr said she "tried to show that no matter how much the world is ravaged, love and art still remain." The Brooklyn Eagles other critic, A.Z. Kruse, also reviewed this solo exhibition. Saying that Gurr "painted with the gusto of a Goya," he praised her "ability to record the emotional impact of an inspired moment" and noted that she held a secure place" in the "front ranks of outstanding American women painters."

During the following decades, Gurr's work continued to be shown at exhibitions of the National Association of Women Painters and Sculptors, the Brooklyn Society of Artists, the New York Society of Women Artists, and the A.C.A. Gallery. She also showed at the World's Fair (1939), the Metropolitan Museum (1942), the Corcoran Gallery of Art (1944), the Artists League of America (1945), the National Academy of Design (1946), the Serigraph Society Galleries (1947), and the American Federation of Arts (1951). Commenting on her fourth solo exhibition at the A.C.A. Galleries in 1947, Howard Devree said she had produced some of her best work to date and a critic for the Brooklyn Eagle noted her use of stepped up color, dynamic line, and bolder composition and said she "delights in painting impressions of life as she sees it around her." In 1950 she made murals and mobile decorations in the ballroom of Hotel Astor in preparation for a benefit event sponsored by Artists Equity to raise money for ill and destitute artists and in 1952 she became Artists Equity's recording secretary.

During her artistic career, Gurr mostly made easel art in oil and casein and also lithographic and silkscreen prints and some watercolors and drawings. Her subjects included still lifes, city scenes, vacation settings, and depictions of war and persecution. Over the years her technique evolved from representative and semi-abstract toward a more abstract semi-cubist style. Many of her pictures were light-hearted and showed, in the words of one critic, a "quiet humor," while others displayed what another critic called "a ready sympathy" for slum-dwellers and "war-stricken humble folk."

During an interview conducted in 1947 she said "It may be social awareness or his personal reaction to nature, an idea, an emotion or an event,.. [but] something more than mere technique should stand out in [the artist's] finished work." And in another interview, three years later, she said her painting style had grown and changed during her career as she herself had grown and changed, but, though her work tended toward increasing abstraction, she insisted that it "must have some kind of human depth to it." In 1959, Stuart Preston, writing in the New York Times, noted that her use of small, flat planes did not prevent her work from displaying liveliness and "an affectionate interest."

Gurr's semi-abstract and semi-cubist works revealed a talent for creative design. Over the course of her career they increasingly showed a lighter tone and what one critic referred to as "stepped up color, dynamic line, bolder composition." In 1950 one critic praised her ability to handle abstraction "in the best modern vein" and a few years later another said she used a style that employed flat planes in a deliberate distortion of reality but her figures and city scenes were nonetheless realistic in nature.

In the 1950s and 1960s she continued to participate in group shows of The National Association of Women Painters and Sculptors (which had renamed itself the National Association of Women Artists in 1941), the Brooklyn Society of Artists, and the A.C.A. Gallery. Thereafter she showed less frequently and the last exhibition to receive public notice during her lifetime seems to have taken place in 1977.

Solo exhibitions

Gurr was given her first solo exhibition at the Brooklyn Museum in 1932. The A.C.A. Gallery gave her solo exhibitions in 1935, 1938, 1945, and 1947. In 1949 her work appeared in what was billed as a "Joint One-Man Serigraph Show" at the Serigraph Galleries in New York. She subsequently received three more A.C.A. solo shows: in 1950, 1953, and 1959

Group exhibitions

Gurr showed regularly in exhibitions of the National Association of Women Painters and Sculptors, the New York Society of Women Artists, and the Brooklyn Society of Artists. Her principal private gallery was the A.C.A. Gallery. Her work appeared under the auspices of the Whitney Studio Club (1926, 1928), and the Municipal Art Committee (1936, 1937). as well as the Society of Independent Artists (1928), the Artists League of America (1945), the National Academy (1946), and the Corcoran Gallery (1947).

Awards

During her professional career Gurr received awards from the National Association of Women Painters and Sculptors (1937, 1947, 1950, 1954, and 1961), the Brooklyn Society of Artists (1943, 1950, 1951, 1954, and 1955), the National Serigraph Association (1950), and the Silvermine Guild of Artists (1957).

Memberships

Gurr was a member of the American Artists Congress, Artists Equity Association, Artists League of America, Artists Union, Audubon Artists, Brooklyn Society of Artists, National Association of Women Painters and Sculptors, New York Society of Women Artists. and the Society of American Graphic Artists.

Art teacher

After leaving high school in 1915 Gurr enrolled in the Brooklyn Training School for Teachers. She took the one-year program and returned for a third semester, following which, in January 1917, she received a certificate to teach drawing. She began her teaching career in 1918 at a New York elementary school and in 1921 was promoted to teach drawing at the junior high level. She remained a junior high art teacher in city schools until her retirement in 1944.

In the summer of 1945, Gurr taught in the city's parks in a program sponsored by the Civilian Defense Volunteer Office. Her sessions at the Brooklyn Botanic Garden proved to be a popular part of the program prompting a reporter from the Brooklyn Daily Eagle to attend one class. "The picture is a creation from your own hand," Gurr told her students, "In your picture you are at liberty to do what you like." She also said that variety in subject matter, center of interest, balance, movement, and design are all elements that are either instinctively known or must be learned. To one student she said, "You'll have to unbalance yourself a bit and then your pictures will be more interesting."

Personal information

Gurr was born in Brooklyn and, apart from brief stays in Manhattan and in Paris, lived there her whole life. Her father was Hyman Gurr and her mother was Ida Gorodnick Gurr. She had two older brothers, Abraham and Samuel, and four younger sisters, Fannie, Jennie, Celia, and Martha. Both parents had immigrated to New York from Russia, Hyman in 1891 and Ida in 1893.  Hyman and Ida were married in the United States. In 1910 Lena, Jennie, Fannie, and Celia were in school and Samuel was in school but also earning money in the tin toy trade. Abraham was living with the rest of the family, earning money as a fitter of gas fixtures. Hyman was employed in the dressmaking trade. In 1910 the family lived in a rented apartment at 55 Seigel Street in the Williamsburg section of Brooklyn.

Gurr attended Eastern District High School, where she participated in the art club, spoke in school assemblies, worked on the literary monthly, and was elected vice-president of the senior class. After graduating in 1915, she studied at the Brooklyn Training School for Teachers and, having attended for an extra semester in the fall of 1917, earned her certificate as a drawing teacher. In May of that year she obtained her teaching certificate.

Gurr met her future husband, Joseph Biel, while they were both students at the Art Students League. She accompanied him to France from 1929 through 1931 and they married on November 24, 1931. Her father died in 1934 and her husband died in 1943 at the age of 52. After marrying, Gurr and Biel had bought a house in the East Flatbush section of Brooklyn and after his death Gurr opted to spend the rest of her life there. "We had planned the home for so long." she told a reporter, "I was determined to stay on there." She did not remarry. They had no children. She died in Brooklyn on February 19, 1992.  She was well organised and said in interview that an artist's studio should be as tidy as an office.  Her papers are now in the Archives of American Art.Other names'''

Gurr used Lena Gurr as her professional name. After marrying she was sometimes referred to as Lena Gurr Biel.

Notes

References

1897 births
1992 deaths
People from Williamsburg, Brooklyn
20th-century American painters
American people of Russian-Jewish descent
Jewish American artists
Jewish women painters
Jewish painters
Modern painters
Art Students League of New York alumni
Eastern District High School alumni
20th-century American Jews